Goniobranchus gleniei is a species of colourful sea slug, a dorid nudibranch, a marine gastropod mollusc in the family Chromodorididae.

Distribution
This species was described from the inner harbour, Trincomalee and Cottiar, opposite Fort Fredrick, Sri Lanka. It has been reported from the Maldives and Tanzania.

Description
Goniobranchus gleniei is a chromodorid nudibranch with a continuous, sinuous black or deep purple line all round the mantle, outside the gills and rhinophores. The outer part of the mantle is white with a faint submarginal grey line. The inner part of the mantle is golden-brown with irregular black spots.

References

Chromodorididae
Gastropods described in 1858